Acacius was a Byzantine military officer, active in Alexandria during the reign of Justinian I (r. 527–565).

Life
Acacius was a native of Amida, and Zacharias Rhetor calls him "Bar Eshkhofo", which seems to mean "son of a cobbler. Zacharias further reports that after the deposition of Patriarch Paul of Alexandria and his replacement by Zoilus (in 539/540), Acacius was the military officer tasked to protect Zoilus from the hostile population of Alexandria. Acacius was probably a professional soldier, but seems to have held a lower position, perhaps a comes rei militaris or a tribunus (cavalry regimental commander).

References

Sources 
 
 

6th-century Egyptian people
6th-century Byzantine military personnel
Byzantine military personnel
Roman-era Alexandrians
Comites